Single Shankarum Smartphone Simranum is a 2023 Indian Tamil-language science fiction comedy film directed by Vignesh Sha P N. The film stars Shiva, Megha Akash, Anju Kurian with Ma Ka Pa Anand and Mano in supporting roles. It was released on 24 February 2023.

Plot 
Madesh, who has a Ph.D. in machine learning, develops an artificial intelligence named Simran that has advanced features and even talks like a real woman. Madesh developed it with financial support from an investor named Hamsa Gupta. Madesh's phone was stolen by two robbers. And in the struggle to save the phone from thieves, he got hurt and went into a coma. Hamsa Gupta finds the thieves and asks them for the phone, but they have already sold it in a mobile shop. The phone was bought by a food delivery boy named Shankar. One day, while Shankar was taking an order for food, a parcel was stolen by someone. At that time, the phone talked to Shankar and helped him collect the money. He thought his phone was haunted, but Simran told him about AI, and she said she could help him. He has a crush on a social media influencer named Tulasi, and he said he wants some money. So Simran gave him the idea to deliver food by drone. Because of Simran's help, Shankar talks with her fondly and even presents miniature accessories for her. So Simran fell for him. And when she proposes, Shankar rejects it, saying she has no body and can't give birth to a child. At the same time, Tulasi and Shankar became friends, and he stopped talking with Simran. So Simran made him happy by winning a crore on a gambling app, so he spoke with her. He thought he was now financially secure, so he went to Tulasi's residence and proposed; she accepted, and they hugged. Simran gets angry and keeps sending alert notifications. While Shankar was driving his car to his home, Simran asked him to love her, but he rejected her. So Simran got furious, and she planned to avenge him by making trouble instead of helping.

Cast

Production 
The film's shooting began on 20 September 2021, and the cast and crew were announced at that same time. The first look poster for the film was released on 4 May 2022. The trailer was later released on 21 February 2023.

Music 

The music of the film is composed by Leon James.

Reception 
The film was released on 24 February 2023 Worldwide. A critic from Times of India gave the film a middling review, 'If you're looking for a mindless comedy entertainer with no logic, Single Shankarum Smartphone Simranum is a good option'.A reviewer from Cinema Express wrote 'A middling film that needed better upgrades'. A critic from Maalaimalar gave a mixture of reviews 'The director gets extra applause by beautifully framing the character of Singer Mano.' " Single Shankarum Smartphone Simranum is a fantastic choice if you're seeking stupid comedic amusement with no logic. " said by indiaherald Critic  abp nadu reviewer stated: " A comedy film in the middle of the action and romantic films. So the single Shankar and the smartphone Simran, which come with a different story, must be watched "

References

External links 

2020s Tamil-language films
2023 comedy films
2023 directorial debut films